American Legion Hall, Post, Building, Hut, or variations, refers to buildings associated with the American Legion. Such buildings in the United States include:

American Legion Hall (Searcy, Arkansas)
American Legion Hut-Des Arc, Des Arc, Arkansas
American Legion Post No. 121 Building, Paris, Arkansas
American Legion Post No. 127 Building, Eudora, Arkansas
American Legion Post No. 131, Leslie, Arkansas
Beely-Johnson American Legion Post 139, Springdale, Arkansas
Bunch-Walton Post No. 22 American Legion Hut, Clarksville, Arkansas
Estes-Williams American Legion Hut No. 61, Yellville, Arkansas
Hall Morgan Post 83, American Legion Hut, Rison, Arkansas
Jess Norman Post 166 American Legion Hut, Augusta, Arkansas
Lynn Shelton American Legion Post No. 27, Fayetteville, Arkansas
Nashville American Legion Building, Nashville, Arkansas
Newport American Legion Community Hut, Newport, Arkansas
Perryville American Legion Building, Perryville, Arkansas
Riggs-Hamilton American Legion Post No. 20, Russellville, Arkansas
Willie Lamb Post No. 26 American Legion Hut, Lepanto, Arkansas
American Legion Post No. 560 (Long Beach, California)
American Legion Post No. 512 Carmel-by-the-Sea, California
American Legion Hall (Eads, Colorado)
American Legion Forest CCC Shelter, Barkhamsted, Connecticut
Milton-Myers American Legion Post No. 65, Delray Beach, Florida
American Legion Cabin, Potlatch, Idaho
American Legion Hall (Shoshone, Idaho)
John Regan American Legion Hall, Boise, Idaho
Nampa American Legion Chateau, Nampa, Idaho
American Legion Memorial Building, Atlantic, Iowa
Carl L. Caviness Post 102, American Legion, Chariton, Iowa
Leo Ellis Post No. 22, American Legion Building, Princeton, Missouri
American Legion Hut (Decatur, Mississippi), Decatur, Mississippi
American Legion Hall (McGill, Nevada)
American Legion Hut (Edmond, Oklahoma)
American Legion Hut (Tahlequah, Oklahoma)
Cushing American Legion Building, Cushing, Oklahoma
American Legion Building (Spartanburg, South Carolina)
American Legion Hut (Hampton, South Carolina)
Faulkton American Legion Hall, Faulkton, South Dakota
Fillmore American Legion Hall, Fillmore, Utah
American Legion Hall (Olympia, Washington)
Jackson Hole American Legion Post No. 43, Jackson, Wyoming
Site of Ferdinand Branstetter Post No. 1, American Legion, Van Tassell, Wyoming
American Legion Post 160 (Smyrna, Georgia)

See also
List of American Legion buildings

American Legion